George Giddens is the name of:
A musician with the band The Dillards
The actor who played Walkinshaw in Foggerty's Fairy